Saint-Martin-de-Belleville is a former commune in the Savoie department in the Auvergne-Rhône-Alpes region in south-eastern France. On 1 January 2016, it was merged into the new commune of Les Belleville.

Saint-Martin-de-Belleville is home to one of the best restaurants in the French Alps, the 3 Michelin starred La Bouitte. It is also the setting for the infamous novel by the Marquis de Sade, The 120 Days of Sodom.

Ski
The Saint-Martin-de-Belleville ski area is part of the Three Valleys ski area that includes the resorts of Les Menuires, Val Thorens, Meribel, Courchevel and La Tania. In total the area has 600 km of posted runs and 200 ski lifts.

Summer
Saint-Martin has also in the past few years increased its publicity of the area for summer visitors. All of the winter brochures now include a section on the summer season that runs most years from 30 June until 1 September. The 3 Valleys links are open on a Tuesday and a Thursday for mountain biking and walking.

Transportation
If travelling there the nearest airports (closest first) are:
 Annecy
 Chambéry
 Grenoble
 Geneva
 Lyon

Notable residents

 Vincent Jay - Olympic Biathlete who won Gold and Bronze at Vancouver 2010

See also
Communes of the Savoie department

References

External links

 Official Saint Martin de Belleville website
 Official site of Les 3 Vallees, lift & piste info, cams, weather, snow etc
 Discover St Martin de Belleville
 Saint Martin de Beleville mobile wap source
 3 Valleys mobile wap source
 Vanoise National Park

Ski areas and resorts in France
Former communes of Savoie